From Bangkok to Mandalay is the film cast by Myanmar and Thailand for the goodwill. In this film, Myanmar movie stars, Nay Toe, Wutt Hmone Shwe Yi, Sai Sai Kham Leng and newbie Thailand actress, Pilaiporn Supinchompu (Naam Whan) performed.

Plot 
When her grandma tells her that she is living two lives in one, Pin (Pilaiporn Supinchompoo) doesn't understand right away. Her grandma then leaves her ten letters as her inheritance. For half a century, they have remained unopened. Grandma's only rule is that Pin must read each one in the location where it was written. Pin packs a bag and her grandma's ashes and travels to Myanmar to try and use the letters to guide herself out of her complicated life.

In Myanmar, Pin meets Kyaw Kyaw (Sai Sai Kham Leng,) a musician and the only person in Myanmar who knew her grandma. Pin asks Kaye Kaye not to flirt with her and he assents, although he knows that he can't honor this promise.

As the journey progresses, Pin discovers that her grandmother's letters are love notes from a mysterious Burmese gentleman. It is initially unclear why Pin's grandmother never opened these letters and why she kept her admirer a secret. Pin is driven to discover the truth, even if it breaks her heart again.

Cast 
Sai Sai Kham Leng as Moe Naing (Kyaw Kyaw)
 Pilaiporn Supinchompoo as Pin
Nay Toe as Nanda
Wutt Hmone Shwe Yi as Thuzar
Anthony Theil as Father Peter
Duantem Salitul as Thuzar (old age) (cameo)

Production
The screenwriter and director Chartchai Ketnust was inspired by the Seni Saowaphong's Pisat (ปีศาจ) novel, with the content about love of different classes.

Awards

Shooting Places 

Yangon
Mandalay
Bagan
Mingun
Thibaw
Pyin Oo Lwin

Bangkok

References

External links
 

2016 films
2016 romantic drama films
Thai-language films
2010s Burmese-language films
Films shot in Myanmar
Burmese multilingual films
Thai multilingual films
2016 multilingual films
Burmese romantic drama films
Thai romantic drama films